Arthur Sulzberger may refer to:
 Arthur Hays Sulzberger (1891–1968), publisher of The New York Times from 1935 to 1961
 Arthur Ochs "Punch" Sulzberger Sr. (1926–2012), son of the above and publisher of The New York Times from 1963 to 1992
 Arthur Ochs Sulzberger Jr. (born 1951), son of the above and publisher of The New York Times from 1992 to 2017
 Arthur Gregg Sulzberger (born 1980), son of the above and publisher of The New York Times since 2018